are tactical detective units of Japanese prefectural police. Special Investigation Teams are maintained by prefectural police headquarters (PPH) and are trained to handle critical incidents including criminal investigation and tactical operations.

History 
In the 1960s, the increase of serious criminal cases such as kidnapping, aircraft hijacking, piracy, and bombings became a serious problem in Japan. The kidnapping of Yoshinobu Murakoshi, a four-year-old child, was the catalyst for the establishment of SITs. In this case, police detective Hachibē Hiratsuka was able to apprehend the suspect, but was too late to save the victim.

It became clear that traditional criminal investigation systems were sluggish and outdated for these new-style, rapid-tempo, and sometimes lethal cases. As a response to these problems, the Tokyo Metropolitan Police Department (TMPD) established the SIT unit within its Criminal Investigation Bureau in 1964. These detectives were well acquainted with new technology and special tactics to track and capture the criminals quickly and accurately.

At the beginning, the name "SIT" came from an acronym of its romanized Japanese unit name, but later, the origin of its name as an acronym of its English nickname, Special Investigation Team, was added afterwards by misunderstanding from an officer who is fluent in English.

This idea achieved a great success that in 1970, the National Police Agency (NPA) requested the establishment of these kind of units for other prefectural police forces throughout Japan. These detectives also became responsible for intervening and rescuing when hostages were in danger. In 1992, TMPD strengthened the SWAT capability by incorporating several SAP operators into its SIT.

Organization

Structure 
These units are generally local-based, so organizations (including their unit names) and equipment are varied. Among them, the Special Investigations Team (SIT) of the TMPD and the Martial Arts Attack Team (MAAT) of the Osaka PPH are the first units to be created and still the most prominent units nationwide.

In the First Criminal Investigation Division of the TMPD, the following units are assigned for special criminal investigation activities:
 
 
 
 
 
 
 
 
 
 

Of all these units, Units One and Two are in charge of hostage cases and especially known as "SIT". As of the early 2000s, there were over 60 detectives in total for these seven units, and about 30 detectives with Unit One and Two alone.

When rural prefectural police are struggling with an investigation, the NPA orders the TMPD or Osaka Prefectural Police to dispatch advisors. These detectives usually work at their respective PPHs, but they may be dispatched to other PPHs to provide advice to the local commander as needed.

The Task Force also conducts research on special investigations, such as participating in training at the Federal Bureau of Investigation and regular joint training sessions are held to disseminate its outcomes. The TMPD's SIT has also received advice on tactical operations from the Far East Field Office of the Naval Criminal Investigative Service in Yokosuka.

Capabilities 
Detectives mandated for special investigation are trained to perform tactical operations, criminal investigation, and manhunts. They are also capable of telephone tapping, stakeouts, surveillance, and crisis negotiation. They are not responsible for counterterrorism, which is the responsibility of security divisions, such as Special Assault Teams (SAT) or Anti-Firearms Squads. However, in some rural prefectures such as Aomori, these detectives can form a counter-terrorism task force together with uniformed officers and riot specialists.

In addition to standard service handguns (.38 Special caliber revolvers such as New Nambu M60, or .32 ACP caliber semi-automatic pistols such as SIG Sauer P230), some units are equipped with large 9×19mm Parabellum caliber semi-automatic pistols (Beretta 92 Vertec, for example) and pistol-caliber carbines (Heckler & Koch MP5SFK, semi-automatic variant of MP5K with foldable stock). They also use non-lethal weapons such as the FN 303 or BGL-65. 

Special Investigation Teams are required to apprehend suspects alive. For this reason, they do not maintain their own sniper teams. If necessary, the security divisions would dispatch sniper teams to the site.

SIT or similar units 
As mentioned above, SIT or similar units have various names and may not have a specific name if they are small in number. The units whose names are known from media reports are as follows:
 Special Investigation Team - Akita, Iwate, Ibaraki, Miyagi, Fukushima, Tochigi, Shizuoka, Aichi, Mie, Fukuoka, Nagasaki, and Tokyo
 Martial Arts Attack Team - Osaka
 Assault Response Team - Chiba
 Special Tactical Section - Saitama
 Special Investigation Section - Kanagawa
 Technical Special Team - Aomori
 Hostage Rescue Team - Hiroshima
 Martial Attacking Rescue Section - Ehime

See also 
 Research and Intervention Brigade – similar units of the National Police in France
 LAPD Special Investigation Section – similar unit of the Los Angeles Police Department in the United States

References

Books 
 
 
 
 
 

Police units of Japan
Special forces of Japan
Police units of the Tokyo Metropolitan Police Department